Rancho Potrero de Santa Clara was a  Mexican land grant in present day Santa Clara County, California given in 1844  by Governor Manuel Micheltorena to James Alexander Forbes.  The name refers to the "pasture lands" of  Santa Clara Mission.  The grant was between the Santa Clara Mission and the Pueblo of San José, south of the present day San Jose International Airport.

History
James Alexander Forbes (1805–1881), born in Scotland, came to Yerba Buena in 1831.  He moved to the Santa Clara Valley, where married Maria Ana Galindo, whose father,  José Crisóstomo Galindo, was the majordomo of the Santa Clara Mission.   Forbes was granted the one square league Rancho Potrero de Santa Clara in 1844.  Forbes sold the Rancho to Commodore Robert F. Stockton in 1847.

With the cession of California to the United States following the Mexican-American War, the 1848 Treaty of Guadalupe Hidalgo provided that the land grants would be honored.  As required by the Land Act of 1851, a claim for Rancho Potrero de Santa Clara was filed with the Public Land Commission in 1852, and the grant was patented to Robert F. Stockton in 1861.

In the 1862 Stockton sold the rancho to Charles B. Polhemus and Henry Newhall, who planned to run railroad tracks through the valley.

References

External links
Rancho de Sta. Clara á el Norte y cononir el posito at The Bancroft Library

Potrero de Santa Clara
Potrero
Santa Clara, California
Potrero